In zoological nomenclature, an unavailable name is a name that does not conform to the rules of the International Code of Zoological Nomenclature and that therefore is not available for use as a valid name for a taxon. Such a name does not fulfil the requirements in Articles 10 through 20 of the Code, or is excluded under Article 1.3.

Unavailable names include names that have not been validly published, such as "Oryzomys hypenemus", names without an accompanying description (nomina nuda), such as the subgeneric name Micronectomys proposed for the Nicaraguan rice rat, names proposed with a rank below that of subspecies (infrasubspecific names), such as Sorex isodon princeps montanus for a form of the taiga shrew, and various other categories.

Notes

References
Hershkovitz, P. 1970. Supplementary notes on Neotropical Oryzomys dimidiatus and Oryzomys hammondi (Cricetinae). Journal of Mammalogy 51(4): 789-794.
Hutterer, R. & Zaitsev, M.V. 2004. Cases of homonymy in some Palaearctic and Nearctic taxa of the genus Sorex L. (Mammalia: Soricidae). Mammal Study 29:89-91.
International Commission for Zoological Nomenclature. 1999. International Code of Zoological Nomenclature, 4th edition. London: The International Trust for Zoological Nomenclature. Available online at https://web.archive.org/web/20090524144249/http://www.iczn.org/iczn/index.jsp. Accessed September 27, 2009.

Zoological nomenclature